The National Union of Israeli Students (Hebrew: התאחדות הסטודנטים בישראל, Arabic: إتحاد الطلاب في إسرائيل; NUIS) has been the representative body of students' throughout Israel since 1934. Today NUIS represents more than 300,000 students in over 64 Universities and Colleges. The Student Union is determined to play a decisive role in Israeli Society and it has placed social impact on a national level as an organizational priority. The Student Union believes that beyond their role of acquiring knowledge, students have the ability and responsibility to build and shape the society they live in and make a considerable impact in the long term.

Structure
NUIS comprises professional departments enacting the policy created for the student community, by the Chairperson and the local student unions in each of the higher education institutes. The professional departments include: Social Involvement, Human Rights and Gender Equality, Scholarships, Academic Affairs, Policy and Research, Government Relations and Lobby, Minority Rights for Students, Fundraising and Foreign Relations, Spokesperson and Public Relations.

The Department of Academic Affairs
The department works first and foremost to advance the quality of learning and the accessibility of Israel’s young population to higher education institutes and vocational schools. Secondly, it represents pro student legislation and the student community before the council for higher education and the planning and budget committees. Thirdly, it aids individual students who struggle inside the system or encounter difficult positions in the academic sphere.

The Unit for the Advancement of Minority Students
The unit operates as part of the academic department. Its core goal is to identify methods, activate projects and implement recommendations advancing the integration of students from minority communities into the academy. The department’s projects empower the minority students, bridge over the existing gaps within the academy and bring sectors closer together.

The Scholarship Department
The department has made a goal of encouraging and leading social change and empower the involvement of students in community and in what is happening in Israeli society. The department strives to lighten the student economic burden of academic studies by granting scholarship in exchange for their activity in a community involvement framework. Additionally, the department is a leading body in Israel for the provision of information regarding scholarships to students.

The Department for Policy and Research
The department works to advance policy and legislation for the improvement of the status of youth and students in Israel, by establishing a body that can derive research and thought. The overall purpose of the department is to provide a centralized support service to all parts of the union and specifically to assist NUIS representatives with clear information and analysis to equip them for effective performance and informed decision-making in the development of union policy.

The Department for Social Involvement
The department acts to advance student involvement in the social sphere in Israel. It aims to enhance the personal awareness and participation of students in projects promoting a positive and equal social reality in Israel. By encouraging individual and group student initiatives, the department molds the student’s status as one who plays a crucial role in regard to struggles relating to the academic world as well as in other fields such as social justice human rights, environment and society.

The Department of Fundraising and Foreign Relations
By generating a joint dialogue and a relationship based on common values and understandings, the department aims at developing and deepening the relationship between the student public in Israel and the student publics all over the world. The department represents NUIS in the international arena, taking an active role in the Israel public diplomacy efforts, and it is a full member of the European Student Union (ESU) and the World Union of Jewish Students (WUJS). The department also represents NUIS in the national and international philanthropic and business world in order to increase NUIS income for the benefit of the Israeli students public.

Spokesperson and the Department for Public Relations
The department is responsible for the branding and image of the student union. Works to explain and reflect the Union’s policy and its decision making as well as promote its goals and core projects in various fields to the Student Associations. Additionally, the department operates in the new media channels among them: Facebook, Twitter and YouTube in order to strengthen the direct and unhindered connection between the students in Israel and the world.

Activities
The Union attracted international attention in 2010 when its president, Boaz Torporovsky, announced a plan  to send a Kurdish Freedom Flotilla "to deliver much-needed humanitarian assistance to the Kurds of Turkey."  Torporovsky describes the plan as a reaction to the Free Gaza flotillas.  He told a reporter that, "There’s a lot of hypocrisy in the world. Turkey, which leads the campaign against Israel and makes all sorts of threats, is the same Turkey that carried out a holocaust and murdered an entire nation of Armenians, and oppresses a minority larger than the Palestinians – the Kurds – who deserve a state, who have demanded a state for longer than the State of Israel has existed."

In the Summer of 2011 citizens of the State of Israel took part in a social protest which was one of the most important event in Israel those years. The National Union and local unions from across the country were extremely important force in promoting and expanding the fight.

Members
NUIS is an umbrella organization that unites local student unions from different universities and colleges in Israel:

Ariel University
Ben-Gurion University of the Negev
Ben-Gurion University of the Negev - Eilat
Bar Ilan University
Tel Aviv University
Ort Braude
Ort Singalovsky
The Jerusalem College of Technology
Shenkar College of Engineering and Design
Givat Washington
The Hebrew University of Jerusalem
The Jerusalem Academy of Music and Dance
The Academic College of Tel Aviv Yafoo
Holon Institute of Technology
Beit Berl College
Western Galilee College
Hemdat Hadarom College
Kinneret College
Shamoon College of Engineering (SCE)
Azrieli College of Engineering Jerusalem
Efrata College of Education
Gordon College of Education
Sapir College
Max Stern Academic College of Emek Yezreel
Tzfat's Community College
Tel-Hai Academic College
Be’er Sheva Technological College
The David Yellin Academic College of Education
The College of Management Academic Studies
The Carmel Academic Center
The Academic Center of Law and Business
Peres Academic Center
Ruppin Academic Center
IDC Herzeliya
The College for Academic Studies in Or Yehuda
Achva Academic College
Ono Academic College
The Ultra Orthodox (Haredi) Campus
WIZO Haifa
Ohaloo College of Education
"Orot Israel” Academic College of Education
ORT Hermelin Academic College of Engineering and Technology
Ort Rehovot College
Oranim College
Emuna College
The Afeka Tel Aviv Academic College of Engineering
Ashkelon Academic College
Hadassah College Jerusalem
Wingate Institute
Levinsky College of Education
The Academic College of Israel in Ramat -Gan
Seminar HaKibutzim
Shaanan College
Sha'arei Mishpat College

See also
 Israeli Students Organization

References

External links
 Official website

Groups of students' unions
Student organizations in Israel
Student organizations established in 1934